The 1957 VFL season was the 61st season of the Victorian Football League (VFL), the highest level senior Australian rules football competition in Victoria. The season featured twelve clubs, ran from 20 April until 21 September, and comprised an 18-game home-and-away season followed by a finals series featuring the top four clubs.

The premiership was won by the Melbourne Football Club for the ninth time and third time consecutively, after it defeated  by 61 points in the 1957 VFL Grand Final.

Premiership season
In 1957, the VFL competition consisted of twelve teams of 18 on-the-field players each, plus two substitute players, known as the 19th man and the 20th man. A player could be substituted for any reason; however, once substituted, a player could not return to the field of play under any circumstances.

Teams played each other in a home-and-away season of 18 rounds; matches 12 to 18 were the "home-and-way reverse" of matches 1 to 7.

Once the 18 round home-and-away season had finished, the 1957 VFL Premiers were determined by the specific format and conventions of the Page–McIntyre system.

Round 1

|- bgcolor="#CCCCFF"
| Home team
| Home team score
| Away team
| Away team score
| Venue
| Crowd
| Date
|- bgcolor="#FFFFFF"
| 
| 12.16 (88)
| 
| 7.17 (59)
| Junction Oval
| 37,000
| 20 April 1957
|- bgcolor="#FFFFFF"
| 
| 8.10 (58)
| 
| 13.15 (93)
| Victoria Park
| 30,000
| 20 April 1957
|- bgcolor="#FFFFFF"
| 
| 10.6 (66)
| 
| 15.12 (102)
| Princes Park
| 24,321
| 20 April 1957
|- bgcolor="#FFFFFF"
| 
| 7.11 (53)
| 
| 6.14 (50)
| Brunswick Street Oval
| 24,000
| 22 April 1957
|- bgcolor="#FFFFFF"
| 
| 19.14 (128)
| 
| 15.15 (105)
| Punt Road Oval
| 23,000
| 22 April 1957
|- bgcolor="#FFFFFF"
| 
| 11.11 (77)
| 
| 10.17 (77)
| Kardinia Park
| 34,844
| 22 April 1957

Round 2

|- bgcolor="#CCCCFF"
| Home team
| Home team score
| Away team
| Away team score
| Venue
| Crowd
| Date
|- bgcolor="#FFFFFF"
| 
| 9.22 (76)
| 
| 8.9 (57)
| Glenferrie Oval
| 21,000
| 27 April 1957
|- bgcolor="#FFFFFF"
| 
| 12.13 (85)
| 
| 7.11 (53)
| Western Oval
| 29,497
| 27 April 1957
|- bgcolor="#FFFFFF"
| 
| 11.8 (74)
| 
| 8.15 (63)
| Windy Hill
| 21,500
| 27 April 1957
|- bgcolor="#FFFFFF"
| 
| 9.13 (67)
| 
| 10.13 (73)
| Arden Street Oval
| 12,000
| 27 April 1957
|- bgcolor="#FFFFFF"
| 
| 10.20 (80)
| 
| 10.12 (72)
| MCG
| 45,571
| 27 April 1957
|- bgcolor="#FFFFFF"
| 
| 6.16 (52)
| 
| 10.16 (76)
| Lake Oval
| 22,385
| 27 April 1957

Round 3

|- bgcolor="#CCCCFF"
| Home team
| Home team score
| Away team
| Away team score
| Venue
| Crowd
| Date
|- bgcolor="#FFFFFF"
| 
| 12.16 (88)
| 
| 9.11 (65)
| Brunswick Street Oval
| 17,000
| 4 May 1957
|- bgcolor="#FFFFFF"
| 
| 19.16 (130)
| 
| 13.9 (87)
| Lake Oval
| 19,275
| 4 May 1957
|- bgcolor="#FFFFFF"
| 
| 13.9 (87)
| 
| 11.12 (78)
| Arden Street Oval
| 11,000
| 4 May 1957
|- bgcolor="#FFFFFF"
| 
| 11.20 (86)
| 
| 5.11 (41)
| MCG
| 42,920
| 4 May 1957
|- bgcolor="#FFFFFF"
| 
| 12.5 (77)
| 
| 12.15 (87)
| Kardinia Park
| 24,292
| 4 May 1957
|- bgcolor="#FFFFFF"
| 
| 9.10 (64)
| 
| 7.9 (51)
| Western Oval
| 34,878
| 4 May 1957

Round 4

|- bgcolor="#CCCCFF"
| Home team
| Home team score
| Away team
| Away team score
| Venue
| Crowd
| Date
|- bgcolor="#FFFFFF"
| 
| 6.15 (51)
| 
| 4.9 (33)
| Glenferrie Oval
| 20,000
| 11 May 1957
|- bgcolor="#FFFFFF"
| 
| 11.14 (80)
| 
| 4.14 (38)
| Windy Hill
| 30,000
| 11 May 1957
|- bgcolor="#FFFFFF"
| 
| 14.9 (93)
| 
| 11.17 (83)
| Victoria Park
| 32,500
| 11 May 1957
|- bgcolor="#FFFFFF"
| 
| 15.12 (102)
| 
| 13.11 (89)
| Princes Park
| 28,888
| 11 May 1957
|- bgcolor="#FFFFFF"
| 
| 16.5 (101)
| 
| 12.12 (84)
| Junction Oval
| 20,000
| 11 May 1957
|- bgcolor="#FFFFFF"
| 
| 16.10 (106)
| 
| 10.31 (91)
| Punt Road Oval
| 16,500
| 11 May 1957

Round 5

|- bgcolor="#CCCCFF"
| Home team
| Home team score
| Away team
| Away team score
| Venue
| Crowd
| Date
|- bgcolor="#FFFFFF"
| 
| 17.17 (119)
| 
| 13.12 (90)
| MCG
| 35,682
| 18 May 1957
|- bgcolor="#FFFFFF"
| 
| 9.10 (64)
| 
| 3.19 (37)
| Kardinia Park
| 18,000
| 18 May 1957
|- bgcolor="#FFFFFF"
| 
| 12.12 (84)
| 
| 13.4 (82)
| Victoria Park
| 29,783
| 18 May 1957
|- bgcolor="#FFFFFF"
| 
| 16.22 (118)
| 
| 13.16 (94)
| Princes Park
| 28,936
| 18 May 1957
|- bgcolor="#FFFFFF"
| 
| 9.16 (70)
| 
| 9.14 (68)
| Arden Street Oval
| 19,000
| 18 May 1957
|- bgcolor="#FFFFFF"
| 
| 7.16 (58)
| 
| 14.16 (100)
| Lake Oval
| 27,500
| 18 May 1957

Round 6

|- bgcolor="#CCCCFF"
| Home team
| Home team score
| Away team
| Away team score
| Venue
| Crowd
| Date
|- bgcolor="#FFFFFF"
| 
| 17.12 (114)
| 
| 6.15 (51)
| MCG
| 28,250
| 25 May 1957
|- bgcolor="#FFFFFF"
| 
| 14.14 (98)
| 
| 10.19 (79)
| Western Oval
| 24,902
| 25 May 1957
|- bgcolor="#FFFFFF"
| 
| 9.12 (66)
| 
| 11.8 (74)
| Windy Hill
| 22,000
| 25 May 1957
|- bgcolor="#FFFFFF"
| 
| 10.13 (73)
| 
| 13.5 (83)
| Junction Oval
| 24,000
| 25 May 1957
|- bgcolor="#FFFFFF"
| 
| 13.13 (91)
| 
| 10.16 (76)
| Arden Street Oval
| 20,000
| 25 May 1957
|- bgcolor="#FFFFFF"
| 
| 12.10 (82)
| 
| 14.12 (96)
| Brunswick Street Oval
| 24,500
| 25 May 1957

Round 7

|- bgcolor="#CCCCFF"
| Home team
| Home team score
| Away team
| Away team score
| Venue
| Crowd
| Date
|- bgcolor="#FFFFFF"
| 
| 12.16 (88)
| 
| 8.9 (57)
| Victoria Park
| 23,458
| 1 June 1957
|- bgcolor="#FFFFFF"
| 
| 13.9 (87)
| 
| 7.20 (62)
| Princes Park
| 34,740
| 1 June 1957
|- bgcolor="#FFFFFF"
| 
| 11.9 (75)
| 
| 11.13 (79)
| Lake Oval
| 15,000
| 1 June 1957
|- bgcolor="#FFFFFF"
| 
| 7.10 (52)
| 
| 6.14 (50)
| Punt Road Oval
| 16,000
| 1 June 1957
|- bgcolor="#FFFFFF"
| 
| 11.11 (77)
| 
| 7.8 (50)
| Glenferrie Oval
| 26,000
| 1 June 1957
|- bgcolor="#FFFFFF"
| 
| 14.15 (99)
| 
| 17.11 (113)
| Kardinia Park
| 17,240
| 1 June 1957

Round 8

|- bgcolor="#CCCCFF"
| Home team
| Home team score
| Away team
| Away team score
| Venue
| Crowd
| Date
|- bgcolor="#FFFFFF"
| 
| 11.15 (81)
| 
| 10.19 (79)
| Punt Road Oval
| 21,000
| 8 June 1957
|- bgcolor="#FFFFFF"
| 
| 10.11 (71)
| 
| 10.17 (77)
| Brunswick Street Oval
| 15,000
| 8 June 1957
|- bgcolor="#FFFFFF"
| 
| 21.12 (138)
| 
| 15.12 (102)
| Windy Hill
| 22,000
| 8 June 1957
|- bgcolor="#FFFFFF"
| 
| 10.11 (71)
| 
| 14.15 (99)
| Princes Park
| 31,096
| 8 June 1957
|- bgcolor="#FFFFFF"
| 
| 9.14 (68)
| 
| 13.11 (89)
| Lake Oval
| 18,200
| 8 June 1957
|- bgcolor="#FFFFFF"
| 
| 12.17 (89)
| 
| 6.4 (40)
| Western Oval
| 34,742
| 8 June 1957

Round 9

|- bgcolor="#CCCCFF"
| Home team
| Home team score
| Away team
| Away team score
| Venue
| Crowd
| Date
|- bgcolor="#FFFFFF"
| 
| 12.13 (85)
| 
| 13.14 (92)
| Victoria Park
| 32,280
| 15 June 1957
|- bgcolor="#FFFFFF"
| 
| 3.12 (30)
| 
| 9.21 (75)
| Junction Oval
| 33,500
| 15 June 1957
|- bgcolor="#FFFFFF"
| 
| 7.14 (56)
| 
| 8.15 (63)
| Arden Street Oval
| 28,000
| 15 June 1957
|- bgcolor="#FFFFFF"
| 
| 12.15 (87)
| 
| 8.12 (60)
| Western Oval
| 28,450
| 17 June 1957
|- bgcolor="#FFFFFF"
| 
| 23.16 (154)
| 
| 14.10 (94)
| MCG
| 48,001
| 17 June 1957
|- bgcolor="#FFFFFF"
| 
| 15.14 (104)
| 
| 7.14 (56)
| Glenferrie Oval
| 23,000
| 17 June 1957

Round 10

|- bgcolor="#CCCCFF"
| Home team
| Home team score
| Away team
| Away team score
| Venue
| Crowd
| Date
|- bgcolor="#FFFFFF"
| 
| 10.8 (68)
| 
| 10.10 (70)
| Kardinia Park
| 12,456
| 22 June 1957
|- bgcolor="#FFFFFF"
| 
| 9.14 (68)
| 
| 14.14 (98)
| Brunswick Street Oval
| 17,500
| 22 June 1957
|- bgcolor="#FFFFFF"
| 
| 11.12 (78)
| 
| 16.13 (109)
| Arden Street Oval
| 14,000
| 22 June 1957
|- bgcolor="#FFFFFF"
| 
| 10.15 (75)
| 
| 8.11 (59)
| Junction Oval
| 21,000
| 22 June 1957
|- bgcolor="#FFFFFF"
| 
| 13.10 (88)
| 
| 7.19 (61)
| Punt Road Oval
| 25,000
| 22 June 1957
|- bgcolor="#FFFFFF"
| 
| 14.16 (100)
| 
| 9.9 (63)
| Victoria Park
| 33,345
| 22 June 1957

Round 11

|- bgcolor="#CCCCFF"
| Home team
| Home team score
| Away team
| Away team score
| Venue
| Crowd
| Date
|- bgcolor="#FFFFFF"
| 
| 10.9 (69)
| 
| 14.8 (92)
| Kardinia Park
| 18,177
| 29 June 1957
|- bgcolor="#FFFFFF"
| 
| 11.14 (80)
| 
| 13.11 (89)
| Windy Hill
| 18,500
| 29 June 1957
|- bgcolor="#FFFFFF"
| 
| 13.14 (92)
| 
| 7.13 (55)
| Princes Park
| 21,454
| 29 June 1957
|- bgcolor="#FFFFFF"
| 
| 12.15 (87)
| 
| 7.9 (51)
| MCG
| 49,512
| 29 June 1957
|- bgcolor="#FFFFFF"
| 
| 15.19 (109)
| 
| 14.12 (96)
| Lake Oval
| 16,200
| 29 June 1957
|- bgcolor="#FFFFFF"
| 
| 10.14 (74)
| 
| 13.15 (93)
| Glenferrie Oval
| 27,000
| 29 June 1957

Round 12

|- bgcolor="#CCCCFF"
| Home team
| Home team score
| Away team
| Away team score
| Venue
| Crowd
| Date
|- bgcolor="#FFFFFF"
| 
| 17.15 (117)
| 
| 10.13 (73)
| Arden Street Oval
| 21,000
| 6 July 1957
|- bgcolor="#FFFFFF"
| 
| 9.11 (65)
| 
| 9.10 (64)
| Western Oval
| 23,578
| 6 July 1957
|- bgcolor="#FFFFFF"
| 
| 11.15 (81)
| 
| 9.17 (71)
| Lake Oval
| 18,000
| 6 July 1957
|- bgcolor="#FFFFFF"
| 
| 24.14 (158)
| 
| 10.14 (74)
| MCG
| 21,370
| 6 July 1957
|- bgcolor="#FFFFFF"
| 
| 12.16 (88)
| 
| 10.13 (73)
| Windy Hill
| 26,500
| 6 July 1957
|- bgcolor="#FFFFFF"
| 
| 7.10 (52)
| 
| 8.13 (61)
| Glenferrie Oval
| 26,000
| 6 July 1957

Round 13

|- bgcolor="#CCCCFF"
| Home team
| Home team score
| Away team
| Away team score
| Venue
| Crowd
| Date
|- bgcolor="#FFFFFF"
| 
| 12.15 (87)
| 
| 8.13 (61)
| Kardinia Park
| 14,806
| 13 July 1957
|- bgcolor="#FFFFFF"
| 
| 7.7 (49)
| 
| 6.13 (49)
| Victoria Park
| 24,216
| 13 July 1957
|- bgcolor="#FFFFFF"
| 
| 11.15 (81)
| 
| 10.5 (65)
| Princes Park
| 20,572
| 13 July 1957
|- bgcolor="#FFFFFF"
| 
| 11.12 (78)
| 
| 10.15 (75)
| Punt Road Oval
| 22,000
| 13 July 1957
|- bgcolor="#FFFFFF"
| 
| 14.16 (100)
| 
| 14.8 (92)
| Junction Oval
| 24,400
| 13 July 1957
|- bgcolor="#FFFFFF"
| 
| 7.10 (52)
| 
| 9.18 (72)
| Brunswick Street Oval
| 12,500
| 13 July 1957

Round 14

|- bgcolor="#CCCCFF"
| Home team
| Home team score
| Away team
| Away team score
| Venue
| Crowd
| Date
|- bgcolor="#FFFFFF"
| 
| 10.13 (73)
| 
| 11.12 (78)
| Punt Road Oval
| 21,000
| 27 July 1957
|- bgcolor="#FFFFFF"
| 
| 7.13 (55)
| 
| 5.4 (34)
| Glenferrie Oval
| 10,000
| 27 July 1957
|- bgcolor="#FFFFFF"
| 
| 9.18 (72)
| 
| 11.7 (73)
| Windy Hill
| 22,500
| 27 July 1957
|- bgcolor="#FFFFFF"
| 
| 13.14 (92)
| 
| 6.8 (44)
| Victoria Park
| 21,316
| 27 July 1957
|- bgcolor="#FFFFFF"
| 
| 11.13 (79)
| 
| 7.10 (52)
| Princes Park
| 31,810
| 27 July 1957
|- bgcolor="#FFFFFF"
| 
| 15.18 (108)
| 
| 8.8 (56)
| Junction Oval
| 14,500
| 27 July 1957

Round 15

|- bgcolor="#CCCCFF"
| Home team
| Home team score
| Away team
| Away team score
| Venue
| Crowd
| Date
|- bgcolor="#FFFFFF"
| 
| 13.11 (89)
| 
| 14.9 (93)
| Arden Street Oval
| 10,000
| 3 August 1957
|- bgcolor="#FFFFFF"
| 
| 15.13 (103)
| 
| 13.13 (91)
| Brunswick Street Oval
| 12,000
| 3 August 1957
|- bgcolor="#FFFFFF"
| 
| 8.18 (66)
| 
| 10.13 (73)
| MCG
| 32,163
| 3 August 1957
|- bgcolor="#FFFFFF"
| 
| 7.8 (50)
| 
| 12.11 (83)
| Western Oval
| 24,942
| 3 August 1957
|- bgcolor="#FFFFFF"
| 
| 9.13 (67)
| 
| 12.19 (91)
| Lake Oval
| 25,300
| 3 August 1957
|- bgcolor="#FFFFFF"
| 
| 11.19 (85)
| 
| 6.7 (43)
| Kardinia Park
| 16,808
| 3 August 1957

Round 16

|- bgcolor="#CCCCFF"
| Home team
| Home team score
| Away team
| Away team score
| Venue
| Crowd
| Date
|- bgcolor="#FFFFFF"
| 
| 6.6 (42)
| 
| 8.13 (61)
| Western Oval
| 13,325
| 10 August 1957
|- bgcolor="#FFFFFF"
| 
| 10.15 (75)
| 
| 7.13 (55)
| Windy Hill
| 16,000
| 10 August 1957
|- bgcolor="#FFFFFF"
| 
| 1.5 (11)
| 
| 6.13 (49)
| Junction Oval
| 17,100
| 10 August 1957
|- bgcolor="#FFFFFF"
| 
| 14.19 (103)
| 
| 8.7 (55)
| Glenferrie Oval
| 12,000
| 10 August 1957
|- bgcolor="#FFFFFF"
| 
| 8.14 (62)
| 
| 8.13 (61)
| Brunswick Street Oval
| 22,000
| 10 August 1957
|- bgcolor="#FFFFFF"
| 
| 11.9 (75)
| 
| 7.9 (51)
| Punt Road Oval
| 22,000
| 10 August 1957

Round 17

|- bgcolor="#CCCCFF"
| Home team
| Home team score
| Away team
| Away team score
| Venue
| Crowd
| Date
|- bgcolor="#FFFFFF"
| 
| 8.10 (58)
| 
| 10.13 (73)
| Kardinia Park
| 12,759
| 17 August 1957
|- bgcolor="#FFFFFF"
| 
| 13.14 (92)
| 
| 11.13 (79)
| Victoria Park
| 20,310
| 17 August 1957
|- bgcolor="#FFFFFF"
| 
| 11.13 (79)
| 
| 5.11 (41)
| Princes Park
| 25,945
| 17 August 1957
|- bgcolor="#FFFFFF"
| 
| 11.9 (75)
| 
| 9.17 (71)
| Lake Oval
| 18,100
| 17 August 1957
|- bgcolor="#FFFFFF"
| 
| 13.11 (89)
| 
| 14.14 (98)
| Punt Road Oval
| 19,000
| 17 August 1957
|- bgcolor="#FFFFFF"
| 
| 13.7 (85)
| 
| 9.10 (64)
| Glenferrie Oval
| 31,000
| 17 August 1957

Round 18

|- bgcolor="#CCCCFF"
| Home team
| Home team score
| Away team
| Away team score
| Venue
| Crowd
| Date
|- bgcolor="#FFFFFF"
| 
| 10.20 (80)
| 
| 17.11 (113)
| Arden Street Oval
| 10,000
| 24 August 1957
|- bgcolor="#FFFFFF"
| 
| 18.12 (120)
| 
| 10.11 (71)
| MCG
| 35,751
| 24 August 1957
|- bgcolor="#FFFFFF"
| 
| 8.11 (59)
| 
| 7.15 (57)
| Western Oval
| 25,436
| 24 August 1957
|- bgcolor="#FFFFFF"
| 
| 15.14 (104)
| 
| 10.20 (80)
| Brunswick Street Oval
| 10,000
| 24 August 1957
|- bgcolor="#FFFFFF"
| 
| 14.12 (96)
| 
| 7.14 (56)
| Junction Oval
| 29,300
| 24 August 1957
|- bgcolor="#FFFFFF"
| 
| 17.21 (123)
| 
| 9.8 (62)
| Windy Hill
| 35,000
| 24 August 1957

Ladder

Night Series Competition
The night series were held under the floodlights at Lake Oval, South Melbourne.

In all other years of the night competition (i.e., 1956–1971), only teams that had finished 5th to 12th on ladder at the end of the home-and-away season competed; i.e., teams which were not playing in any of the end of season finals matches.

In 1957, due to the perceived popularity of the competition's initial year (1956), all twelve VFL clubs played in the 1957 Night Series. The series was marred by bad weather, with two matches having to be abandoned. Only an average of 16,000 spectators attending each of the 11 matches that were played. In 1958, the competition reverted to the 1956 structure, where only teams finishing 5th to 12th on the ladder competed.

Final: South Melbourne 15.13 (103) defeated Geelong 8.4 (52)

Premiership Finals
This season was the first Hawthorn season ever in the finals after entering the league for the 33rd season.

First Semi-Final

Second Semi-Final

Preliminary Final

Grand final

Awards
 The 1957 VFL Premiership team was Melbourne.
 The VFL's leading goalkicker was Jack Collins of Footscray who kicked 74 goals.
 The winner of the 1957 Brownlow Medal was Brian Gleeson of St Kilda with 24 votes.
Minor premiers  finished second with 164.
 Geelong took the "wooden spoon" in 1957.
North Melbourne 14.13 (97) defeated  13.15 (93) in the Grand Final, held as a curtain raiser to the firsts Grand Final on 21 September.

Notable events
 Following the successful introduction of televised sport in 1956, the VFL decides to allow the live broadcast of the last quarter of three VFL matches each Saturday afternoon. Experiments conducted in 1956 involving three "closed circuit" telecasts of three of the finals matches, and the live broadcast of the Olympic Games' demonstration match had shown that it was possible to from "wide-shots" to "close-ups" quickly enough to provide effective viewing. Each station's telecast had a principal commentator: Tony Charlton (HSV-7), Ken Dakin (ABV-2), and Ian Johnson (GTV-9).
 In Round 4, Richmond defeated Fitzroy by 15 points despite having fifteen fewer scoring shots. This remains the greatest deficit in scoring shots by a winning side, though equalled by Geelong against Collingwood in 1977.
 In August, learning from the success of the Olympic Games, and in an attempt to counter the problems of overnight queues outside the Melbourne Cricket Ground prior to each final, the VFL sold reserved tickets through the mail for the finals series. It was also anticipated that this would greatly assist country people, who could now book seats and accommodation well in advance.
 Hawthorn made the final four for the first time since their VFL debut in 1925, ending the longest finals drought in VFL/AFL history (thirty-two years and 595 matches).
 Allan Nash becomes the last umpire to officiate in all games of a finals series.

Sources
 Rogers, S. & Brown, A., Every Game Ever Played: VFL/AFL Results 1897–1997 (Sixth Edition), Viking Books, (Ringwood), 1998. 
 Ross, J. (ed), 100 Years of Australian Football 1897–1996: The Complete Story of the AFL, All the Big Stories, All the Great Pictures, All the Champions, Every AFL Season Reported, Viking, (Ringwood), 1996.

References

External links
 1957 Season – AFL Tables

Australian Football League seasons
Vfl season